Dicumyl peroxide is an organic compound with the formula  (Me = CH3). Classified as a dialky peroxide, it is produced on a large scale industrially for use as an initiator for the production of low density polyethylene.

Production
It is synthesized as a by-product in the autoxidation of cumene, which mainly affords cumene hydroperoxide.  Alternatively, it can be produced by the addition of hydrogen peroxide to α-methylstyrene.  

Of the ca. 60,000 ton/y production of dialkyl peroxides, dicumyl peroxide is dominant.

Properties
Dicumyl peroxide is relatively stable compound owing to the steric protection provided by the several substituents adjacent to the peroxide group.  Upon heating, it breaks down by homolysis of the relatively weak O-O bond.

References

 
Organic compounds